Estonian National Male Choir (abbreviated RAM) is an Estonian male choir. As of about 2020, it is the largest full-time professional male choir in the world.

The choir was founded in 1944 by Gustav Ernesaks. At the beginning, the choir was named as Estonian SSR State Philharmonic Male Choir. In 1953, the choir was named to State Academic Male Choir, and since 1989 the choir carries the name Estonian National Male Choir.

Chief conductors:
 1944–1975 Gustav Ernesaks
 1964–1991 Olev Oja
 1966–1990 Kuno Areng
 1991–1997 Ants Üleoja 
 1994–2005, 2008–2011 Ants Soots
 2005–2008 Kaspars Putninš
 since 2011/2012  Mikk Üleoja

During its existence of over 60 years, the choir has given over 6000 concerts in Estonia and abroad.

Awards:
 2004 Grammy Award in the category "Best Choral Performance"
 2005 Orchestral Album of the Year, voted in BBC Music Magazine

References

Estonian choirs